Sonja Bašić (born 26 November 1987) is a Croatian handball player for Nantes Loire Atlantique Handball and the Croatian national team.

She competed for the Croatian team at the 2012 Summer Olympics in London.

Her father is handball coach and former player Mirko Basic.

References

Croatian female handball players
1987 births
Living people
Handball players at the 2012 Summer Olympics
Olympic handball players of Croatia
Handball players from Zagreb
Mediterranean Games bronze medalists for Croatia
Competitors at the 2013 Mediterranean Games
Expatriate handball players
Croatian expatriate sportspeople in Hungary
Croatian expatriate sportspeople in North Macedonia
Mediterranean Games medalists in handball
21st-century Croatian women